Zaglubotskaya is a rural locality (a village) in Gorodishchenskoye Rural Settlement, Nyuksensky District, Vologda Oblast, Russia. The population was 9 as of 2002.

Geography 
Zaglubotskaya is located 55 km southeast of Nyuksenitsa (the district's administrative centre) by road. Zadny Dvor is the nearest rural locality.

References 

Rural localities in Nyuksensky District